Recruits is an Australian factual television program that premiered on Channel Ten on 4 May 2009. A second season began on 29 July 2010.

Overview
Recruits follows the day-to-day life of a group of police recruits on their way to becoming police officers in the New South Wales Police Force. It follows two groups of Policing recruits and Probationary Constables from the New South Wales Police College at Goulburn, showing how they use their training and skills as probationary constables in the state.

DVD releases
As of April 2015 series 1 and 2 DVD have been discontinued, series 1 can be found on DVD sites like eBay. But series 2 is rare to get on DVD now.

References

Australian factual television series
Network 10 original programming
Television shows set in New South Wales
2009 Australian television series debuts
2010 Australian television series endings
Documentary television series about policing
English-language television shows